Karaevliya is a village in the Uğurludağ District of Çorum Province in Turkey. Its population is 105 (2022).

References

Villages in Uğurludağ District